Marinus "René" Augustinus Josephus Pijnen (born 3 September 1946) is a Dutch former racing cyclist.
 
He became Olympic champion in the 100 km team time-trial in the 1968 Summer Olympics with Joop Zoetemelk, Fedor den Hertog and Jan Krekels; he finished fifth in the individual road race.

Professional career 
A professional from 1969 to 1987, Pijnen was a capable track cyclist, winning the European madison championship  six times, a record he shares with Patrick Sercu). He also won 72 six-day races out of 233 starts, with numerous partners. He was also a time trial expert, winning several. He won four stages of the Vuelta a España, three of those in the 1971 Vuelta, which he led for 10 days.

Pijnen rode on the road with TI–Raleigh, managed by another Dutch track specialist, Peter Post, but he said the length of road races bored him, and that he frequently found himself looking at his watch to see how much longer he would have to ride.

After cycling 
When he retired, he ran – among other enterprises he already started during his cycling career – a hotel in Bergen op Zoom, the North Brabant province where he was born.

See also
 List of Dutch Olympic cyclists

References

1946 births
Living people
Olympic gold medalists for the Netherlands
Dutch male cyclists
Dutch track cyclists
Olympic cyclists of the Netherlands
Cyclists at the 1968 Summer Olympics
People from Woensdrecht
Olympic medalists in cycling
Dutch Vuelta a España stage winners
Medalists at the 1968 Summer Olympics
UCI Road World Championships cyclists for the Netherlands
Cyclists from North Brabant
20th-century Dutch people
21st-century Dutch people